, first son of regent Matsudono Motofusa, was a Kugyō (high-ranking Japanese official) of the late Heian and Kamakura periods.

Despite being first-born, he was treated as if he were not, while his stepbrother Moroie inherited the male-line. Hence, he called himself , avoiding the use of the name Matsudono. In 1220, just before the Jōkyū War, he retired from politics, becoming a Buddhist monk.

References 

1163 births
1245 deaths
Matsudono family
People of Heian-period Japan
People of Kamakura-period Japan
Kamakura period Buddhist clergy